Dream On is a 2015 American documentary film starring John Fugelsang.

Overview
Comedian John Fugelsang set outs see if the American Dream is still alive by retracing the journey taken across the United States by French historian Alexis de Tocqueville in 1831 that inspired his 1835 book Democracy in America, which gave birth to the concept of the American Dream.

References

External links

2015 films
American documentary films
Documentary films about the United States
2010s English-language films
2010s American films